Sorradile is a comune (municipality) in the Province of Oristano in the Italian region Sardinia, located about  north of Cagliari and about  northeast of Oristano.

Sorradile borders the following municipalities: Ardauli, Bidonì, Ghilarza, Nughedu Santa Vittoria, Olzai, Sedilo, Tadasuni.

References

Cities and towns in Sardinia